Nanshahekou Subdistrict is a township-level division of the southwest of the Shahekou District of Dalian, Liaoning, China.

Administration
There are 12 communities within the subdistrict.

Communities:
Hanyang Community
Houshan Community
Lanting Community
Nanshahekou Community
Taikuo Community
Yuanzhongyuan Community
Shuifushanzhu Community
Taoshan Community
Haijian Community
Xinghairenjia Community
Xingfuejia Community (幸福ｅ家社区)
Dongfang Community

See also
List of township-level divisions of Liaoning
Shahekou

References

External links
南沙河口街道党建网 

Dalian
Township-level divisions of Liaoning
Subdistricts of the People's Republic of China